Peter Pryor (25 February 1930 – 19 February 2005) was an Australian racing cyclist. He competed in three events at the 1952 Summer Olympics.

References

External links
 

1930 births
2005 deaths
Australian male cyclists
Olympic cyclists of Australia
Cyclists at the 1952 Summer Olympics
Australian track cyclists
Place of birth missing
Place of death missing
20th-century Australian people
21st-century Australian people